Owen T. Carroll Field is a multi-purpose stadium in South Orange, New Jersey on the campus of Seton Hall University. It is the home field of the Seton Hall Pirates baseball and men's and women's soccer teams. The stadium hosted Seton Hall football team until 1982 when the school cut football.  The stadium holds 261 spectators.  It is named for Owen T. Carroll, former coach of the Seton Hall baseball team The facility underwent a $6.5 million renovation in 2006 that included a new Field Turf surface and light stanchions. In June 2010, the Field Turf surface was upgraded once again, and in 2013, a new scoreboard was added. In 2019, Seton Hall Baseball will be playing all of their games away from South Orange, including nine Big East "home" games in New York City while the facility undergoes major renovations.

See also
 List of NCAA Division I baseball venues

References

External links
Venue information

College baseball venues in the United States
Seton Hall Pirates baseball
Baseball venues in New Jersey
1907 establishments in New Jersey
Sports venues completed in 1907
College soccer venues in the United States
Soccer venues in New Jersey
Seton Hall Pirates soccer